Arthur Louis Smith (October 24, 1915 – February 24, 2010) was an American football and basketball coach. He served as the head football coach at Alma College in Alma, Michigan from 1956 to 1962.

Head coaching record

College football

References

1915 births
2010 deaths
Alma Scots athletic directors
Alma Scots football coaches
Alma Scots football players
Idaho Vandals baseball coaches
Idaho Vandals football coaches
Idaho Vandals men's basketball coaches
Whitworth Pirates baseball coaches
Whitworth Pirates men's basketball coaches
High school baseball coaches in the United States
High school basketball coaches in Idaho
High school basketball coaches in Michigan
High school football coaches in Idaho
High school football coaches in Michigan
Sportspeople from Sault Ste. Marie, Ontario